Leasowe railway station is a station serving the village of Leasowe, in Merseyside, England. It lies on the West Kirby branch of the Wirral Line, part of the Merseyrail network.

Location
The station is in Reeds Lane, on the edge of Moreton and around 500 metres south of the village of Leasowe which is on the north Wirral coast. It is just 1 km east of Moreton station on the same line, and has a Park and ride facility for commuters to Liverpool.

History
Leasowe station was originally opened on the Hoylake Railway in 1870, as Leasowe Crossing without a proper platform, but it closed less than two years later. The station opened again on 5 May 1894, when the line from Bidston (1.5 km to the east) to Moreton was doubled. It was built by the Wirral Railway on their line from Birkenhead Park to West Kirby.

Through electric services to Liverpool Central commenced on 13 March 1938, when the LMS electrified the lines from Birkenhead Park to West Kirby. The service was provided by the then-new LMS electric multiple units. However, on Sunday mornings, the service was provided by the older Mersey Railway electric units, which had until then only run from Liverpool to Birkenhead Park. The platform buildings were replaced in 1938, rebuilt in a similar style to those along the line towards West Kirby, and a footbridge was added. The signal box, used to operate the level crossing and replacing a cabin on the westbound platform, was moved to the opposite side of Reeds Lane and was also improved at the time.

The station did not have a goods yard; it just had two lines straight through. Nonetheless, freight did pass through the station from the nearby Cadbury factory, also  in Moreton. The 8-lever signal box was in use until 24 July 1994, and demolished afterwards.

Facilities
The station is staffed, during all opening hours, and has platform CCTV. Each of the two platforms has a waiting room. There is a payphone, booking office and live departure and arrival screens, for passenger information. The station has a free "Park and Ride" car park, with 204 spaces, lighting columns and CCTV to meet Merseytravel's Travelsafe requirements, as well as a cycle rack. There is step-free access, to the booking office and platforms, for wheelchairs and prams.

Services
Current services are every 15 minutes (Monday to Saturday daytime) to West Kirby and Liverpool.  At other times, trains operate every 30 minutes. These services are provided by Merseyrail's fleet of Class 507 and Class 508 EMUs.

The station also has a number of connecting Merseytravel bus services.

Gallery

References

Sources

External links 

Railway stations in the Metropolitan Borough of Wirral
DfT Category E stations
Former Wirral Railway stations
Railway stations in Great Britain opened in 1870
Railway stations in Great Britain closed in 1872
Railway stations in Great Britain opened in 1894
Railway stations served by Merseyrail
1866 establishments in England